Cutter v Powell (1795) 101 ER 573 is an English contract law case, concerning substantial performance of a contract.

Facts
Cutter agreed he would sail with Powell from Kingston, Jamaica to Liverpool, England. The contractual note read as follows.

“Ten days after the ship Governor Parry, myself master, arrives at Liverpool, I promise to pay to Mr. T. Cutter the sum of thirty guineas, provided he proceeds, continues and does his duty as second mate in the said ship from hence to the port of Liverpool. Kingston, July 31st, 1793.”

Cutter died after seven weeks. It was a ten-week voyage. The ship left on 2 August, Cutter died on 20 September and the ship arrived on 9 October. The ship captain refused to pay any wages at all. Mrs Cutter sued to recover the wages for the part of the journey that the husband had survived.

It was apparent that the usual wages of a second mate of a ship on such a voyage was four pounds per month: but when seamen are shipped by the run from Jamaica to England, a gross sum was usually given. The usual length of a voyage from Jamaica to Liverpool was about eight weeks.

Submissions
The arguments for the plaintiff, Mrs Cutter, went as follows.

Arguments on behalf of the defendant.

Judgment
The Court of King's Bench held that Cutter was not entitled to wages because he had not completed the journey. Part performance was no performance at all. Lord Kenyon CJ led with his judgment.

Ashhurst J concurred, emphasising that the contract was entire and that completion was a condition precedent to the obligation to pay.

Grose J concurred.

Lawrence J concurred.

See also
Sumpter v Hedges [1898] 1 QB 673
Britton v. Turner, 6 N.H. 481 (1834) an employee who left work on a farm after six months, but had contracted to be paid $120 at the end of one year, was entitled to receive some payment ($95) even though the contract was not completed. 
Jacob & Youngs v. Kent, 230 N.Y. 239 (1921) a NY Court of Appeal case by Cardozo J.
Hoenig v Isaacs [1952] EWCA Civ 6, 2 All ER 176
Bolton v Mahadeva [1972] 2 All ER 1322
Wilusynski v London Borough of Tower Hamlets [1989] ICR 493, Nicholls LJ holding no "substantial performance" by - and no pay whatsoever for -  a council worker on industrial action who did everything but answer enquiries from councillors.

Notes

References

External links
 Judgment on BAILII

English unjust enrichment case law
English termination case law
1795 in British law
1795 in case law
Court of King's Bench (England) cases